University Burgundy Franche-Comté (Université Bourgogne Franche-Comté) is the association of universities and higher education institutions (ComUE) for institutions of higher education and research in the French region of Bourgogne-Franche-Comté. Its headquarters are in Besançon.

The university was created as a ComUE according to the 2013 Law on Higher Education and Research (France), effective 1 April 2015.

Members 
University of Burgundy - Franche-Comté brings together the following institutions:

 University of Burgundy;
 University of Franche-Comté;
 Université de technologie de Belfort-Montbéliard;
 École nationale supérieure de mécanique et des microtechniques;
 AgroSup Dijon
 Burgundy School of Business.

References

External links 
 University of Burgundy - Franche-Comté website

Universities in France